The Tabataud Quarry (sometimes also written Tabateaud) is situated in the northwestern French Massif Central. The quarry used to be mined for its granodiorite.

Geography

The Tabataud Quarry was excavated along the left bank of the river Bandiat at an elevation of 165 metres, only about one kilometer southeast of Nontron town centre. Nearby passes the D 707 from Nontron to Saint-Pardoux-la-Rivière, from which it is easily accessible. In the immediate vicinity are two more adjoining quarries, the Maspeyrot-Lagarde quarry and the Moulin Blanc quarry, which are both older. All these quarries are closed by now and they are dangerous due to rockfall.

The quarry is noted for its minerals. The Tabataud quarry most probably yielded the finest galenas in the whole of France. It is furthermore one of the very few sites for wulfenite in France. As a rarity occurs the pseudomineral ozocerite. The cerussite is of extremely good quality and diversity.

Geology
The Tabataud quarry and its two satellites were worked from the Piégut-Pluviers Granodiorite, more precisely from its dark, fine-grained, biotite- and amphibole-bearing (green hornblende) border facies. Because of its slight blueish hue the rock used to be called granite bleu (blue granite) by the local population. Along the west side of the quarry crosses a NNE-SSW-striking fault zone that sets off the granodiorite from the plagioclase-bearing paragneisses farther west (Nontron Paragneiss). Within the quarry the granodiorite is traversed by a stockwork of mineralized dikes. Altogether 17 southeast-northwest-striking lodes are encountered. They only reach thicknesses of about 3 centimeters, an exception being the Puyssechet lode near the Moulin Blanc quarry, which is 30 cm thick and strikes east-west. Besides the lodes there are also some pegmatite dikes.

Mineralogy

The encountered lodes in the quarry belong to the classical sphalerite-pyrite-galena-chalcopyrite ore mineral association. Like in the nearby Cantonnier Lode the mineralizations formed hydrothermally in a medium temperature range of 300 to 150°C. But unlike in the Cantonnier lode the veins in the Tabataud quarry clearly focus on the primary mineral galena and not on its secondary minerals.

Matrix minerals in the lode are quartz and/or baryte. Common minerals are calcite and dolomite. Secondary minerals consist of lead minerals like anglesite, cerussite, pyromorphite and wulfenite, and of iron sulfides like marcasite and pyrite. A rarity is the bitumen containing pseudomineral ozocerite.

In the pegmatite veins one finds well developed garnets (grain size 2 millimeters), millimetric tourmaline (schorl) and asparagus-coloured apatite reaching 5 millimeters in size.

Attached a detailed description of the lode minerals:
 anglesite (PbSO4): rare; millimetric, colourless prisms.
 baryte (BaSO4): common in matrix; leafy habit, white coatings, spherical nodules, occurs together with galena (and marcasite).
 calcite (CaCO3): late stage mineral in tension gashes; associated with galena; pointed (reflecting) and flattened (dull) rhombohedra; milky singular crystals can reach 5.5 centimeters.
 cerussite (PbCO3): local concentrations; crystallizes on galena as its alteration product; decimetric coatings with millimetric crystals; crossed habit, prisms, elongated crystals along a- and c-axis; white singular crystals and twins.
 dolomite (CaMg (CO3)2): relatively rare; millimetric, rose coloured rhombohedra, sometimes displaying a saddle-shaped habit.
 galena (PbS): very common; crystals can reach several centimeters; occurs most often weathered (with a coating of iron oxide), often dull (due to oxidation), yet can display a brilliant luster and show excellent quality in some protected tension gashes; cubes and octahedra; grows on quartz, sometimes on calcite, dolomite or baryte; overgrown by cerussite, pyrite, marcasite, quartz and ozocerite.
 marcasite (FeS2): very common low temperature mineral; prone to weathering; overgrows galena; often well formed millimetric singular crystals; decimetric coatings; cock's comb habit; twins after (110).
 ozocerite (pseudomineral): very rare; associated with quartz and galena; small (0.09 millimeter), brown spheres consisting of bitumen (mixture of liquid and solid carbohydrates of the methane-family).
 pyrite (FeS2): relatively rare; spherical aggregates on millimetric quartz crystals, in some places also on dolomite.
 pyromorphite (Pb5[Cl/(PO4)3]): common; well formed crystals are rare; coatings on heavily altered galena; the galena can disappear altogether such that a boxwork of pyromorphite is left; faint yellow to deeply green crystals; light green, needle-shaped pyromorphite can grow in strongly altered enclaves within the granodiorite.
 quartz (SiO2): common matrix mineral; very beautiful, 5 to 8 millimeter-sized, (double-ended) singular crystals on galena; can be covered by a thin coat of pyromorphite and some microcrystals of wulfenite; classical habit with badly developed prisms; colourless to milky; some individuals can be smoky or amethyst-like.
 sphalerite (ZnS): not very common; microcrystals associated with galena.
 wulfenite (Pb[MoO4]): very rare; normally on dull green pyromorphite; very beautiful, orange-coloured, tabular, singular crystals that are 2 to 3 millimeters in size but can occasionally reach 10 millimeters ; formed near the surface; the molybdenum probably derives from molybdenite finely disseminated within the granodiorite.

The pegmatites, mineralized lodes and tension gashes all indicate an extensional tectonic setting within the granodiorite (dated as Serpukhovian), operative during its cooling stage. This enabled the pneumatolytic and hydrothermal solutions to deposit their dissolved mineral contents. The higher temperature pegmatites most likely preceded the hydrothermal deposits. A uranium-lead dating on galena yielded Lower Permian ages (300 to 250 million years BP). The spatial arrangement of the lodes and gashes hints at a transtensional, dextral shear zone oriented NW-SE.

History 
Quarrying started in the Tabataud quarry in the 1890s. The encountered ores were gathered, but the focus of the mining activities was the granodiorite itself. In the beginning the granodiorite was a highly esteemed building and cobble stone, but was milled later on mainly to gravel (for roadworks etc.). In 2003 the mining came to a final halt; since then the quarry is used as a storage area for the countless trees uprooted by cyclone Lothar in 1999. It is flooded by now.

Literature 
 Duthou, J.-L. et al. (1974). Les gisements plombo-zincifères du seuil du Poitou et de sa bordure Limousine. Bulletin du BRGM, section II, n° 1, p. 453 -474.
 Floc'h, J.-P. et al. Feuille Nontron. Carte géologique de la France à 1/50 000. BRGM, Orléans.
 Guillemot, J., Lebocey, J. & Legrand, N. (2008). Minéralogie de la carrière Tabataud, Nontron, Dordogne. Le Règne Minéral, vol. 84, p. 27 – 33.

Geology of France
Mineralogy
Geography of Dordogne
Buildings and structures in Dordogne